Independence High School (or, The Big I) is a high school in Mint Hill, North Carolina (with a Charlotte mailing address). The school mascot is the Patriots and the school colors are green and gold.

Academics
The school no longer has magnet programs, since the International Baccalaureate program was relocated to another school several years ago. However, the Academy of International Studies has now been incorporated into Independence, creating a 'school within a school' feeling. This program is sponsored by the Bill and Melinda Gates Foundation and encourages students to be aware of both their communities and the world. The Academy of Engineering was also later added, which is funded by NAF. 
In 2006, more than twenty students participated in an exam to be able to attend the Governor's School of North Carolina, a state-sponsored program for extremely gifted students, established by NC senator Terry Sanford.  The previous year, six students from Independence met all the requirements to participate in the School.  The requirements include writing two essays and receiving teacher recommendations. Though school officials expected more students to be accepted into the program, only two students made the cut in 2007.

Athletics
In sports, Independence High School, also known as "the Big I" or "Indy" are a part of the North Carolina High School Athletic Association (NCHSAA) and compete in the Southwestern 4A Conference. The schools team name is the Patriots, with the school colors being green and gold.

Independence Patriots Football

During the 2000s, the Independence varsity football team, coached by Tom Knotts and Bill Geiler, won 109 straight games, that included seven straight North Carolina High School Athletic Association (NCHSAA) State Championships (4–AA). Their streak ended on September 1, 2007, when Cincinnati Ohio's Elder High School defeated Independence in overtime, 41–34. Independence holds the national record winning streak for a public school football team, with 109 straight wins without a loss. De La Salle High School holds the longest win streak overall, private or public, with 151 wins.

Former Head Coach Tom Knotts has won a North Carolina 4A record of seven state championships, six state championships won at Independence and one at West Charlotte. Coach Knotts has taken every school he has coached at to the state championship game. He also has the best winning percentage of any NC head football coach to coach at least 20 years or longer. Knotts became known for turning formerly average teams into powerhouse programs (Harding, Independence, Dutch Fork).

The Patriots would continue their winning streak in the absence of Head Coach Tom Knotts in 2004. In that year, Independence had its strongest year of its streak and the most dominant year in the history of the state averaging 54 points a game and averaging 8 points against them. During Coach Knotts absence, Bill Geiler took over head coaching duties. Coach Knotts left for a season to be the quarterbacks coach for the Duke Blue Devils football program, but returned to Independence after a single season at his alma mater. After Coach Tom Knotts left Independence in 2009, Coach Bill Geiler took back over as head coach for three years from 2010–2012.

During their long winning streak, the Independence football team was invited to appear on the NFL pre-game show before the Carolina Panthers game on Sunday, October 1, 2006.

Independence Patriots Basketball

The Patriots Men's Varsity Basketball team won the NCHSAA State Championship (4–A) in 1997 versus Richmond Senior High School. The Men's Varsity Basketball team would win the NCHSAA 4A State Championship again in 2018, against Heritage High School.

Notable alumni
 Adonis Alexander, NFL cornerback
 Jacob Coggins, former professional soccer player
 Chris Cole, Libertarian Party activist
 Chelsea Cooley, Miss USA 2005
 Gregory Clifton, former NFL wide receiver
 Joe Cox, former American football quarterback and now coach
 Austin Duke, professional American football wide receiver
 Steve Gabbard, former NFL offensive tackle
 Kim Morgan Greene, TV star and Broadway performer
 DeVonte Holloman, former NFL linebacker
 Chris Leak, former professional quarterback, led the Florida Gators to the 2007 BCS National Championship
 Radell Lockhart, football defensive lineman coach with the Catawba Indians
 Mohamed Massaquoi, former NFL wide receiver
 Dave Moody, artist, producer, songwriter, and filmmaker
 Dre Moore, former NFL defensive tackle
 Hakeem Nicks, former NFL wide receiver and was a Super Bowl XLVI champion with the New York Giants
 Darryl "D.J." Smith, former NFL linebacker
 Jobey Thomas, professional basketball player
 Jack Tocho, professional football player in the NFL and AAF
 Tony White, professional basketball player

References

External links
 

Public high schools in North Carolina
Educational institutions established in 1967
1967 establishments in North Carolina
Schools in Mecklenburg County, North Carolina